Saadet Özkan (born 1978) is a Turkish activist against child abuse. She is a primary school teacher who found out that her pupils had been sexually abused by her principal. Despite pressure she succeeded in getting the crime investigated. She is an International Women of Courage Award recipient.

References

Turkish women activists
Living people
1978 births
Turkish human rights activists
Turkish schoolteachers
People from İzmir
Recipients of the International Women of Courage Award